The following diagnostic systems and rating scales are used in psychiatry and clinical psychology. This list is by no means exhaustive or complete.  For instance, in the category of depression, there are over two dozen depression rating scales that have been developed in the past eighty years.

Diagnostic classification

Diagnostic criteria
Diagnostic and Statistical Manual of Mental Disorders (DSM)
Chinese Classification of Mental Disorders
Feighner Criteria
Research Diagnostic Criteria (RDC), 1970s-era criteria that served as a basis for DSM-III
Research Domain Criteria (RDoC), an ongoing framework being developed by the National Institute of Mental Health
International Classification of Diseases (11th Revision)

Interview instruments using the above criteria
Structured Clinical Interview for DSM-IV (SCID)
Schedule for Affective Disorders and Schizophrenia (SADS)
Kiddie Schedule for Affective Disorders and Schizophrenia (K-SADS)
Mini-international neuropsychiatric interview (MINI)
World Health Organization Composite International Diagnostic Interview (CIDI)
Schedules for Clinical Assessment in Neuropsychiatry (SCAN)
Diagnostic Interview for Genetic Studies (DIGS)

Rating scales

Addiction

 Alcohol Use Disorders Identification Test
 Bergen Shopping Addiction Scale
 CAGE Questionnaire
 CRAFFT Screening Test

ADHD

 ADHD Rating Scale
 Adult ADHD Self-Report Scale (ASRS v1.1)
 Disruptive Behavior Disorders Rating Scale
 Swanson, Nolan and Pelham Teacher and Parent Rating Scale
 Vanderbilt ADHD Diagnostic Rating Scale

Autism spectrum

 Autism Spectrum Quotient (AQ)
 Childhood Autism Rating Scale (CARS)
 Childhood Autism Spectrum Test (CAST)
 Autism Diagnostic Observation Schedule (ADOS)
 Ritvo Autism and Asperger Diagnostic Scale (RAADS)

Anxiety

Beck Anxiety Inventory
 Child PTSD Symptom Scale
Clinician Administered PTSD Scale (CAPS)
Daily Assessment of Symptoms – Anxiety
Generalized Anxiety Disorder 7 (GAD-7)
Hamilton Anxiety Scale (HAM-A)
Hospital Anxiety and Depression Scale
Panic and Agoraphobia Scale (PAS)
Panic Disorder Severity Scale (PDSS)
PTSD Symptom Scale – Self-Report Version
Screen for child anxiety related disorders
Social Phobia and Anxiety Inventory-Brief form
Social Phobia Inventory (SPIN)
Taylor Manifest Anxiety Scale
Trauma Screening Questionnaire
UCLA PTSD Index
Yale–Brown Obsessive Compulsive Scale (Y-BOCS)
Zung Self-Rating Anxiety Scale

Dementia and cognitive impairment

Abbreviated mental test score
Addenbrooke's Cognitive Examination
Clinical Dementia Rating
General Practitioner Assessment Of Cognition
Informant Questionnaire on Cognitive Decline in the Elderly
Mini-mental state examination
Montreal Cognitive Assessment

Dissociation

 Dissociative Experiences Scale (DES)

Depression

 Beck Depression Inventory (BDI)
 Beck Hopelessness Scale (BHS)
 Centre for Epidemiological Studies - Depression Scale (CES-D)
 Center for Epidemiological Studies Depression Scale - Revised (CESD-R)
 Center for Epidemiological Studies Depression Scale for Children (CES-DC)
 Children's Depression Inventory (CDI)
 Edinburgh Postnatal Depression Scale (EPDS)
 Geriatric Depression Scale (GDS)
 Hamilton Rating Scale for Depression (HAM-D)
 Hospital Anxiety and Depression Scale (HADS)
 Kutcher Adolescent Depression Scale (KADS)
 Major Depression Inventory (MDI)
 Montgomery-Åsberg Depression Rating Scale (MADRS)
 Patient Health Questionnaire (PHQ) 
 Mood and Feelings Questionnaire (MFQ)
 Weinberg Screen Affective Scale (WSAS)
 Zung Self-Rating Depression Scale (SDS)

Eating disorders

Anorectic Behavior Observation Scale
Binge Eating Scale (BES)
Eating Attitudes Test (EAT-26)
Eating Disorder Inventory (EDI)

Mania and bipolar disorder

Altman Self-Rating Mania Scale (ASRM)
Bipolar Spectrum Diagnostic Scale
Child Mania Rating Scale
General Behavior Inventory
Hypomania Checklist
Mood Disorder Questionnaire (MDQ)
Young Mania Rating Scale (YMRS)

Personality and personality disorders

Buss-Perry Aggression Questionnaire (AGQ)
Hare Psychopathy Checklist
Minnesota Multiphasic Personality Inventory
Narcissistic Personality Inventory
Minnesota Borderline Personality Disorder Scale

Schizophrenia and psychosis

Brief Psychiatric Rating Scale (BPRS)
Positive and Negative Syndrome Scale (PANSS)
Scale for the Assessment of Positive Symptoms (SAPS)
Scale for the Assessment of Negative Symptoms (SANS)

Other
 Barnes Akathisia Scale
 Child and Adolescent Symptom Inventory (CASI)
 SAD PERSONS scale for suicide risk

Global scales
Clinical Global Impression
Comprehensive Psychopathological Rating Scale (CPRS)
Global Assessment of Functioning (GAF) 
Children's Global Assessment Scale

See also
Marlowe–Crowne Social Desirability Scale
Mental status examination
Psychological testing

References

Diagnosis classification